The Fussball Club Basel 1893 1978–79 season was their 85th season since the club was founded. It was their 33rd consecutive season in the top flight of Swiss football after they won promotion during the season 1945–46. They played their home games in the St. Jakob Stadium. This was René Theler's third period as chairman.

Overview

Pre-season
Helmut Benthaus was first team manager for the fourteenth consecutive season. There were only a few changes in the squad. Eigil Nielsen moved on to Luzern. Serge Muhmenthaler was forced to terminate his playing career early due to his injury. Muhmenthaler would return a few years later as referee. From the season 1984–85 as referee in the Swiss Football Association and from 1989 as FIFA-Referee. From 1980 until the end of his career in December 1997 he conducted about 250 Swiss and some 75 international games. Walter Mundschin retired from active football. During his time with Basel from 1965 to 1978, Mundschin played a total of 437 games and scored 67 goals. 230 of these games were in the Nationalliga A, 52 in the Swiss Cup or Swiss League Cup, in the European competitions (European Cup, Cup Winners' Cup, UEFA cup and Cup of the Alps) and 98 were friendly games. He scored 44 goals in the domestic league, five in the cup competitions, four in the European competitions and the other 14 were scored during the test games. Mundschin won the Swiss championship six times, the Swiss Cup twice and the League Cup once.

There were also a few new players in the squad. Robert Baldinger joined from Wettingen, Erwin Meyer joined from SC Emmen and Rolf Schönauer joined from local club SC Binningen. All other mutations were internal between the first team and the reserves.

Benthaus led the team in a total of 59 games in their 1978–79 season. 32 of these games were in the domestic league, three in the Swiss Cup, six in the Swiss League Cup, two in the 1978–79 UEFA Cup, four in the Cup of the Alps and 12 were friendly matches. The team scored a total of 110 goals and conceded 97.

Domestic league
Basel played in the 1978–79 Nationalliga A. This was contested by the first 10 teams from the previous season and the newly promoted teams Nordstern Basel and Chiasso. After a double round-robin in the qualification phase, the top six teams played in a championship group for the title and the bottom six teams in the relegation group. The teams in these two groups started with the bonus of half the points from the qualifying phase (rounded up). The champions were to qualify for 1979–80 European Cup, the second and third teams to qualify for the 1979–80 UEFA Cup. Basel ended the qualification round in fourth position and finished the Championship Group in sixth position with 18 points. They ended the season 17 points behind championship winners Servette who won all ten matches in the championship stage. Basel scored a total of 54 goals conceding 53 in 32 games. Detlev Lauscher was the team's top goal scorer with 14 league goals.

Swiss Cup and League Cup
In the first round of the Swiss Cup Basel were drawn against FC Glattbrugg and this was the first time that these two clubs had ever played against each other. The game was played on 7 October 1978 and Basel won 7–0. In the second round Basel were drawn away and won against Zürich. In the third round Basel were away against Xamax and were knocked out of the competition. In the final on 20 June 1979 in the Wankdorf Stadium in Bern Servette were matched against Young Boys and won the cup winning the game 3–2. The Cup winners were to qualify for the 1979–80 European Cup Winners' Cup, but because Servette became champions the runners-up inherited this slot.

In the first round of the Swiss League Cup Basel were drawn against Grenchen. This was played as a two legged affair, winning the home game and losing away game, Basel advanced 4–3 on aggregate. Basel won in the round of 16 against Nordstern Basel. In the quarter-final they won against Luzern and in the semi-final they won against Xamax to reach the final. The final was played on 5 May 1979 in the Wankdorf Stadium. This was against Servette and after extra time the score was 2–2. In the end Servette won 4–3 on penalties and completed the national treble, Championshup, Cup and League Cup.

UEFA Cup and Coppa delle Alpi
In the 1978–79 UEFA Cup Basel were drawn against VfB Stuttgart. The first game was lost 2–3 in St. Jakob Stadium and the away game in the Neckarstadion was lost 1–4. VfB Stuttgart won 7–3 on aggregate and continued to the second round.

In the Coppa delle Alpi (to English Cup of the Alps) Basel played with Stade de Reims and Sochaux in Group B together with Lausanne-Sport. Lausanne-Sport won the group and thus advanced to play in the final only to lose this against the winners of group A, Servette FC, 0–4.

Players 
 
 
 
  
 
 
 
 
 
 
 
 

  
 

 
 

 
 

Players who left the squad

Results 
Legend

Friendly matches

Pre-season

Winter break and mid-season

Nationalliga

Qualifying phase matches

Qualifying round table

Championship group matches

Championship group table

Championship group table

Swiss Cup

Swiss League Cup

Servette won 4–3 on penalties

UEFA Cup

First round

VfB Stuttgart won 7–3 on aggregate.

Coppa delle Alpi

Group B

NB: teams did not play compatriots

Group table

See also
 History of FC Basel
 List of FC Basel players
 List of FC Basel seasons

References

Sources
 Rotblau: Jahrbuch Saison 2015/2016. Publisher: FC Basel Marketing AG. 
 Die ersten 125 Jahre. Publisher: Josef Zindel im Friedrich Reinhardt Verlag, Basel. 
 FCB archive online
 Switzerland 1978–79 at RSSSF
 Swiss League Cup at RSSSF
 Cup of the Alps 1978 at RSSSF

External links
 FC Basel official site

FC Basel seasons
Basel